Shell Haven was a port on the north bank of the Thames Estuary at the eastern end of Thurrock, Essex, England and then an oil refinery. The refinery closed in 1999 and the site was purchased by DP World who received planning consent in May 2007 for the new London Gateway deep water container port at the site. The neighbouring Coryton Refinery remained in operation until 2012.

History
Shell Haven appears on the 1596 edition of Saxton's Map 'Essexiae Comitat' Nova vera ac absaluta descriptio' It was possibly mentioned earlier.
Shell Haven was mentioned in Samuel Pepys' Diary on 10 June 1667.

The site, historically also referred to as Shellhaven was originally an inlet on the north bank of the Thames, about a mile to the west of Canvey Island. This was the mouth of Shell Haven Creek, which runs east and south of the village of Fobbing, and originally separated Corringham Marsh from Fobbing Marsh. To the east was Shell Haven House. Sources differ on when Shell Haven first became associated with the oil industry; the first edition Ordnance Survey map of the early 19th century shows Oil Mill Farm a mile or so up Shell Haven Creek. Shell Haven was for over 80 years the site of a large Shell oil refinery, but there seems to be no evidence for the company taking its name from the site.

In the 1850s, a branch line was constructed from the London Tilbury and Southend Railway (LT&SR) to a new port immediately to the east of Shell Haven, to be known as Thames Haven (sometimes written Thameshaven). The name of Shell Haven would probably have been eclipsed, but for the failure of Thames Haven to prosper, and the later arrival of the Shell oil company.

In 1895, the ammunition firm Kynochs purchased Borley Farm, to the east of Shell Haven Creek, to build an explosives factory. This opened in 1897, with a small estate called Kynochtown. Kynochs also built the Corringham Light Railway (CLR), with a passenger branch from the works to Corringham and a goods branch to the LT&SR at Thames Haven. The Kynoch works closed in 1919. The site and CLR were taken over by coal merchants Cory Brothers Ltd of Cardiff to build an oil storage depot, with Kynochtown being renamed Coryton. The oil depot eventually became Coryton Refinery (run from 1950 until recently by Mobil and its antecedents), which remains in production, between Shell Haven Creek and Hole Haven to the east.

Shell Oil first arrived in the form of the Asiatic Petroleum Company Ltd, a sales company formed by Royal Dutch Petroleum and the British company Shell Transport and Trading Company, prior to their merger as Royal Dutch Shell. A licence was obtained in 1912 to store petroleum at Shell Haven, in iron tanks, each containing not more than 4,000 tonnes. The maximum storage allowed for the whole site was 80,000 tonnes. Refinery operations began on a 40 hectare (100 acre) site in 1916 with a distillation plant which produced fuel oil for the Admiralty. In 1919, this unit was converted to manufacture road surfacing bitumen. In 1925, a bench still was erected for the manufacture of lubricating oils; the first high viscosity oils were produced in 1937.
Other plants were erected before the outbreak of war, including a blending plant for producing horticultural chemical products.

During World War 2 the refineries and oil storage tanks at Thames Haven, Shell Haven and Coryton became a sitting target for air raids, notably in September 1940, during the Battle of Britain.

In 1946, a plant producing high grade Paraffin Wax for candles, paper, etc. was commissioned. In 1947, expansion began on a 400 hectare (1,000 acre) site west of the original refinery.

In 1948, financial sanction was approved by the Board of Shell Petroleum Co Ltd for the construction of a new large crude oil refinery, based primarily on the processing of Kuwait crude.

The facilities were to include: 
A Crude Distillation Unit, with a design intake of 6,000 tonnes/day of Kuwait Crude. It was given the designation CDU1.
A High Vacuum Unit with a design intake of 3,500 tonnes/day of Kuwait Long Residue. Designated HVU for CCF (cat cracker feed).
A Thermal Reformer with a design intake of 1,200 tonnes/day Kuwait Naphtha.
A Gasoline Doctor Treater
Three 17bar Steam Boilers (MP Boilers 3, 5 and 6) and a once through salt cooling water system.

In 1950, the Crude Distillation Unit, the Doctor Treater and MP Boilers 3, 5 and 6 were commissioned.

Subsequently, various units were added to produce valuable hydrocarbons from the distillation residue. In 1956, a catalytic reforming 'Platformer' was brought into service and in the same year, a petroleum chemicals unit to manufacture alkylbenzenes, the basis of household detergents. A second crude distillation unit was commissioned in 1959, and a second catalytic reformer in 1967. A kerosene hydrotreater was commissioned in 1972 and in 1977 a third reformer. In 1979, a hydrocracking unit was added to increase the proportion of light distillates. A new bitumen plant started production in 1981.

In 1992, a major capital investment was completed, adding a 'Naphtha Minus' complex which contained an isomerisation unit, benzene recovery and gas turbine power generation. A new Control Centre was added. By then the plant had a capacity of 4.6 million tonnes per annum, and covered 800 hectares (2,000 acres), with a  perimeter and its own generating plant, emergency and other services. It had five jetties, handling tankers of up to 300,000 tons capacity. The refinery delivered products by road and ship and UK oil pipeline network.

Incidents 

In the period of 1970–1973, major fires broke out at the refinery three times.

Closure and decommissioning 
The Shell refinery closed in 1999. A team consisting of operations and engineering personnel were picked from the workforce to carry out decommissioning and oversee the demolition of the refinery. Shell Haven Refinery was decommissioned and demolished, apart from The Bitumen Plant and some Storage Tanks. The two reactors from the Hydrocracker Unit were transferred to the Shell Rhineland Refinery in Cologne, Germany in July 2004 and added to an already existing unit of four crackers of the same type. The two Shellhaven reactors continued operation in 2005 and are operational until today.

In 2006, the site was purchased by DP World, one of the largest marine terminal operators in the world, as part of the company's purchase of P&O. In May 2007, DP World received outline planning consent for a major new deepwater port on the site, known as London Gateway. In addition to the new port, the development will include one of Europe's largest logistics parks, providing access to London, the South East and the rest of the UK.

In May 2008, the Department for Transport issued a 'Harbour Empowerment Order' for London Gateway, which provided official and statutory powers for the new port and established London Gateway as a legally recognised authority. DP World is now set to invest over £1.5bn to develop the project over the next 10 to 15 years.

The Bitumen Unit was in the process of being decommissioned in 2010.

The site is currently being remediated by Hydrock as part of the redevelopment to an industrial and distribution park.

Shell Haven Refinery
The Refinery was used as a location in the film Quatermass 2.

References

External links

Vision of Britain – Old OS Maps
Thurrock council -Thurrock Heritage – Factfiles 49 – Corringham Light railway
About Shell – The Shell history – the beginnings
An account of the visit to the Shell Haven Oil Refinery 1990
Institute of Petroleum Interactive Guide to UK Refineries – Shell Haven (Shell)
London Gateway Planning Inquiry
London Gateway website

Infrastructure in London
Industry on the River Thames
Economy of London
History of the petroleum industry in the United Kingdom
Oil refineries in the United Kingdom
Port of London
Ports and harbours of Essex
Ports and harbours of the North Sea
Ports and harbours of the Thames Estuary
Shell plc buildings and structures
Science and technology in Essex
Thurrock